The WRU National Championship (or Admiral Championship for sponsorship reasons) is the second tier of professional rugby union in Wales. The league was reformed by the Welsh Rugby Union (WRU) in 2012.

The current National Championship champions are Pontypool RFC, who won consecutive titles in 2016/17, 2017/18 and 2018/19.

History
In 2012, the new division was formed from the restructuring of the Welsh Premier Division. The Premier Division was 'slimmed down' to 12 teams with Pontypool RFC and Tonmawr RFC relegated from the division. Tonmawr had already made the decision to opt out of the new league and would start the 2012–13 season in Division Six.

The National Championship is the second tier, which lies below the first tier Welsh Premier Division in Welsh club rugby. Above Welsh club rugby sides are the four regions, the Scarlets, Ospreys, Cardiff Blues, and Dragons, as part of regional rugby, who instead compete in the Pro14.

Restructuring process 
The teams for the league would be decided on three factors. Firstly, the holding of an 'A Licence' based on stadium criteria. The signing of a 'Participation Agreement' and judged on league results over the previous six seasons. It was originally decided that the Premiership would reduce in size to ten teams. It was announced that four clubs, Pontypool, Tonmwar, Bridgend Ravens and Carmarthen Quins RFC had not achieved the required criteria to be included into the new league. However, pressure from Ospreys and Scarlets backers led to the league being extended to 12 teams with Bridgend and Carmarthen included. Tonmawr, citing financial reasons, opted not to take part in the new league at all and re-entered themselves into Division Six.

2012 Pontypool legal challenge
The new league came under scrutiny in 2012 when Pontypool RFC launched a legal challenge to avoid being the only club relegated to the new division, which they ultimately lost on the grounds of 'meritocracy'. Pontypool had finished 12th in the previous campaign, above rivals Bedwas RFC and level on points with historic rivals Newport RFC.

2018–19 season 

Correct as of 26 February 2019

2017–18 season 

"r" denotes relegation to the WRU Division One East or WRU Division One West

2016–17 season

2015–16 season

2014–15 season

Winners

References

External links
Webpage

 
Rugby union leagues in Wales
Sports leagues established in 2012